Terence Soall (22 March 1920 – 10 August 2006) was an English actor who appeared in numerous television productions over a 50-year period and in over 100 films.

Early life
He was born into a working-class family in Tottenham, North London. After he left school at 16 he first became a journalist with an American News Agency on Fleet Street. He then served in the Royal Air Force during World War II and was stationed in Gibraltar where he joined a theatre group. Upon his return to the UK he found work as an actor with the West Riding Theatre Company. He then made his West End debut and as an actor on stage he appeared in the original London production of Fiddler on the Roof playing the Rabbi.

Television appearances
His television appearances include; Coronation Street, Anna Karenina (1977), Dixon of Dock Green (1959), The Avengers (1963), Stand Up Nigel Barton (1965)  and Porridge (1975) as the prison medical officer.

Film appearances
His film appearances include; Darling (1963), Georgy Girl (1966), Venom (1971), and Orlando (1992).

Soall was also the director of a drama school in Birmingham and he directed tourists in St. James's Park in his later years.

Filmography

References

External links

1920 births
2006 deaths
English male television actors
English male film actors
People from Tottenham
Royal Air Force personnel of World War II